Albert Minnigareyevich Lukmanov (born 15 December 1974) is a Russian professional football coach and a former player. He is an assistant coach with FC Veles Moscow.

Club career
He played in the Russian Football National League for FC Gastello Ufa in 1992.

References

1974 births
Footballers from Ufa
Living people
Russian footballers
Association football defenders
FC Neftyanik Ufa players
FC Sodovik Sterlitamak players
FC Bashinformsvyaz-Dynamo Ufa players
Russian football managers